Nick Jones (born June 26, 1990) is an American professional ice hockey defenseman who is currently an unrestricted free agent. He most recently played for Grizzlys Wolfsburg of the Deutsche Eishockey Liga (DEL).

Playing career
Jones played collegiate hockey for the Mercyhurst Lakers in the NCAA Men's Division I Atlantic Hockey conference. In his junior year, Jones was named to the 2012-13 All-AHA First Team.

On August 27, 2014, Jones signed his first professional contract, a one-year deal, with the Worcester Sharks of the AHL. Prior to the 2014–15 season, he was assigned to ECHL club, the Indy Fuel.

On September 3, 2015, Jones signed a one-year contract with ECHL's reigning champions, the South Carolina Stingrays. In the 2015–16 season, Jones registered 19 points in 52 games from the blueline.

On June 26, 2016, Jones agreed to a one-year deal with Norwegian club, Stjernen Hockey, of the GET-ligaen.

On May 1, 2017, Jones signed an initial one-year contract with the HC Plzeň of the Czech Extraliga. Following his second season with Plzeň in 2018–19, Jones left the Czech Republic to sign a one-year contract as a free agent with German club, Grizzlys Wolfsburg of the DEL on June 4, 2019.

Awards and honors

References

External links 

1990 births
American men's ice hockey defensemen
Grizzlys Wolfsburg players
Ice hockey players from Pennsylvania
Indy Fuel players
Living people
Mercyhurst Lakers men's ice hockey players
Ontario Reign (ECHL) players
HC Plzeň players
South Carolina Stingrays players
Stjernen Hockey players
Worcester Sharks players
People from Butler County, Pennsylvania
American expatriate ice hockey players in the Czech Republic
American expatriate ice hockey players in Germany
American expatriate ice hockey players in Norway